The Jordan Academy of Arabic is one of the Arabic language regulators based in Amman, Jordan. Besides the Jordan Academy of Arabic, there are 10 other Arabic language and literature regulators in the world. 
It has been set up to start by 1924, but could only be in real-life by 1976.

It has a biannual journal named: "The Journal of Jordan Academy of Arabic". Many dictionaries and occasional publications have been also produced by this Academy, as its interest covers Arabization of technical and professional terms, facilitating the use of Arabic in tertiary education as well as regulating the Arabic language and literature.

History
The founding of the Jordan Academy of Arabic was published in the Journal of the Arab Scientific Academy in Damascus in January, 1924. It was the second Arabic language regulator to be founded in the Arab world after the Arab Scientific Academy in Damascus which was founded in 1919. Due to the scarcity of financial, scientific and human resources,  it was short-lived. A royal decree to re-establish the Jordan Academy of Arabic was issued in 1976. It officially assumed its responsibilities as of the first of October 1976, and joined the Cairo-based Union of Arab Scientific and Language Academies in 1977.

See also 
 Jordanian Arabic
 Arabic literature
 List of language regulators

References

External links 
 Official website (archived) (in Arabic and English)
 the Jordan Academy of Arabic website

Arabic language
Arabic language regulators